Elaeocarpus holopetalus, commonly known as black olive berry, mountain blueberry, or mountain quandong, is species of flowering plant in the family Elaeocarpaceae and is endemic to eastern Australia. It is a shrub or small tree with regularly toothed, lance-shaped to egg-shaped leaves, racemes of white flowers and black, oval fruit.

Description
The trunk is straight with relatively smooth dark grey or brown outer bark with some fissures and wrinkles. Young branchlets are densely covered with woolly-brownish or velvety hairs. The leaves are mid to dark green above, paler below and the edges have regular teeth. There are between fifteen and twenty stamens.

Taxonomy
Elaeocarpus holopetalus was first formally described in 1861 by Ferdinand von Mueller in Fragmenta Phytographiae Australiae.

Distribution and habitat

Gallery

References

Oxalidales of Australia
Trees of Australia
holopetalus
Flora of New South Wales
Flora of Victoria (Australia)
Trees of mild maritime climate
Plants described in 1861
Taxa named by Ferdinand von Mueller